D. J. Jordan was a lawyer, professor, and college president.

He wrote articles. His wife was a school principal in Atlanta. He wrote on whether “Negro” educators should teach at colleges for African American students in Daniel Wallace Culp’s 1902 book, which also profiled him.

He was a professor at Morris Brown College. He served as president of Edward Waters College.

References

Heads of universities and colleges in the United States
Morris Brown College faculty
Edward Waters College faculty
20th-century American educators
Year of birth missing
Year of death missing